Scarlet Street is a 1945 American film noir directed by Fritz Lang. The screenplay concerns two criminals who take advantage of a middle-aged painter in order to steal his artwork. The film is based on the French novel La Chienne (literally The Bitch) by Georges de La Fouchardière, which had been previously dramatized on stage by André Mouëzy-Éon, and cinematically as La Chienne (1931) by director Jean Renoir.

The principal actors Edward G. Robinson, Joan Bennett and Dan Duryea had earlier appeared together in The Woman in the Window (1944), also directed by Lang. Local authorities in New York, Milwaukee, and Atlanta banned Scarlet Street early in 1946 because of its dark plot and themes.

The film is in the public domain.

Plot
New York, 1934 – Christopher "Chris" Cross, a meek amateur painter and cashier for a clothing retailer, is fêted by his employer for 25 years of service. After presenting Chris with a gold watch and kind words, company head J.J. Hogarth leaves the party and gets into a car with a beautiful blonde. Chris muses to a colleague about his desire to be loved by a young woman like that.

Walking home through Greenwich Village, Chris sees a young woman, Katherine "Kitty" March, being attacked, and knocks her assailant unconscious with his umbrella. After Chris dashes off to summon a policeman, the assailant, who is actually Kitty's boyfriend Johnny, flees. Chris walks Kitty to her apartment. His wistful remarks about art suggest to her that Chris must be a wealthy painter. Enamored of Kitty and thinking she feels affection for him, Chris tells her about his loveless marriage. His shrewish wife Adele idolizes her previous husband, a policeman believed drowned while trying to rescue a suicidal woman.

Needing funds for a shady business deal, Johnny believes that Kitty should play on Chris's naivete and feign romantic interest in the supposed rich artist to swindle money from him. Kitty persuades Chris to rent her an apartment, suggesting that he could use it as his art studio. To finance the apartment, Chris steals $500 in insurance bonds from his wife and later $1,000 cash from his employer.

Unknown to Chris, Johnny tries selling some of his paintings, leaving them with a street vendor who thinks them worth no more than $25. The paintings attract the interest of art critic David Janeway, who declares the work as exceptional. After Johnny persuades Kitty to pretend that she painted them, she charms Janeway with Chris's own views about art. Captivated by the paintings and by Kitty, Janeway promises to represent her. However, Adele sees her husband's paintings, signed "Katherine March", in the window of a commercial art gallery and accuses Chris of copying March's work. Chris confronts Kitty, who claims that she had sold them because she needed the money. Delighted that his creations are appreciated, he lets her become the public face of his art. She becomes a huge commercial success, although Chris never receives any of the money.

Adele's supposedly dead first husband Higgins appears at Chris's office to extort money from him. Higgins did not drown but disappeared after stealing $2,700 from the purse of the woman whom he had tried to save. Already suspected of taking bribes from speakeasies, he faked his death to escape his crimes and his wife. Chris steals another $200 from the safe at work for Higgins. Chris plots for Adele to see Higgins, hoping that his marriage will be invalidated when Adele realizes that Higgins is still alive.

Chris goes to see Kitty, believing that he is now free and that she will marry him. He finds Johnny and Kitty in an embrace, confirming his suspicions that they are romantically involved. However, Chris asks Kitty to marry him, but she spurns him for being old and ugly and laughs in his face. Enraged, he stabs her to death with an ice pick. The police visit Chris's office. Higgins has told them that Chris embezzled money from Hogarth, who refuses to press charges, but fires Chris. Johnny is arrested for Kitty's murder.

At the trial, Johnny's past works against him. Chris denies painting the pictures, claiming to be an untalented artist. Several witnesses confirm Chris's testimony and attest to Johnny's misdeeds and bad character. Johnny is convicted and put to death for Kitty's murder, Chris goes unpunished and Kitty is erroneously immortalized as a great artist. Haunted by the murder, Chris attempts to hang himself on the night of Johnny's execution, but is rescued. Five years later, Chris is homeless and destitute, with no way of claiming credit for his own paintings. He witnesses his portrait of Kitty sell for $10,000. Tormented by thoughts of Kitty and Johnny loving each other eternally, Chris wanders New York, constantly hearing their voices in his mind.

Cast

 Edward G. Robinson as Christopher Cross
 Joan Bennett as Katherine 'Kitty' March
 Dan Duryea as Johnny Prince
 Margaret Lindsay as Millie Ray
 Rosalind Ivan as Adele Cross
 Jess Barker as David Janeway
 Charles Kemper as Patch-eye Higgins
 Anita Sharp-Bolster as Mrs. Michaels (as Anita Bolster)
 Samuel S. Hinds as Charles Pringle
 Vladimir Sokoloff as Pop LeJon
 Arthur Loft as Delarowe
 Russell Hicks as J.J. Hogarth

Production

Scarlet Street reunited director Fritz Lang with actors Edward G. Robinson, Joan Bennett and Dan Duryea, who had worked with him in The Woman in the Window (1944). The film was based on the French novel La Chienne (literally The Bitch) by Georges de La Fouchardière, which had been dramatized on stage by André Mouëzy-Éon, and cinematically as La Chienne (1931) by director Jean Renoir. Lang's film Human Desire (1954) was based on another Renoir film, La Bête humaine (1938), which was based on Émile Zola's novel on the same name. Renoir was said to have disliked both of Lang's films.

Scarlet Street is similar to The Woman in the Window in its themes, cast, crew and characters. Robinson again plays a lonely middle-aged man, and Bennett and Duryea once more play the criminal elements. Both films were photographed by Milton R. Krasner. Walter Wanger, who produced the film, had earlier produced Lang's 1937 film You Only Live Once.

Though Scarlet Street is considered a film noir classic along with Lang's earlier film The Woman in the Window, Robinson, who noticed the thematic similarities between the two, found the production of Scarlet Street monotonous and was eager to finish it and move on to other projects. Robinson had also disliked making The Woman in the Window.
 
Twelve paintings created for the film by John Decker were sent to the Museum of Modern Art in New York City for exhibition in March 1946.

Reception

Box office
According to Variety, the film earned rentals of $2.5 million in the U.S.

Reception

New York Times film critic Bosley Crowther gave the film a mixed review. He wrote:

But for those who are looking for drama of a firm and incisive sort, Scarlet Street is not likely to furnish a particularly rare experience. Dudley Nichols wrote the story from a French original, in which it might well have had a stinging and grisly vitality. In this presentation, however, it seems a sluggish and manufactured tale, emerging much more from sheer contrivance than from the passions of the characters involved. And the slight twist of tension which tightens around the principal character is lost in the middle of the picture when he is shelved for a dull stretch of plot. In the role of the love-blighted cashier Edward G. Robinson performs monotonously and with little illumination of an adventurous spirit seeking air. And, as the girl whom he loves, Joan Bennett is static and colorless, completely lacking the malevolence that should flash in her evil role. Only Dan Duryea as her boy friend hits a proper and credible stride, making a vicious and serpentine creature out of a cheap, chiseling tinhorn off the streets.

A review in Variety magazine stated: "Fritz Lang's production and direction ably project the sordid tale of the romance between a milquetoast character and a gold-digging blonde ... Edward G. Robinson is the mild cashier and amateur painter whose love for Joan Bennett leads him to embezzlement, murder and disgrace. Two stars turn in top work to keep the interest high, and Dan Duryea's portrayal of the crafty and crooked opportunist whom Bennett loves is a standout in furthering the melodrama."

Time magazine gave Scarlet Street a negative review, describing the plot as clichéd and with dimwitted, unethical, stock characters.

Critic Dennis Schwartz wrote in 2003:Scarlet Street is a bleak psychological film noir that has the same leading actors as his 1944 film The Woman in the Window. It sets a long-standing trend of a criminal not punished for his crime; this is the first Hollywood film where that happened ... The Edward G. Robinson character is viewed as an ordinary man who is influenced by an evil couple who take advantage of his vulnerability and lead him down an amoral road where he eventually in a passionate moment loses his head and commits murder. Chris's imagination can no longer save him from his dreadful existence, and his complete downfall comes about as the talented artist loses track of reality and his dignity.

In 1995, Matthew Bernstein wrote in Cinema Journal: "The film is a dense, well-structured film noir and has been analyzed and interpreted numerous times. Some of the earliest interpretations came from censors in three different cities," adding:
On January 4, 1946, the New York State Censor Board banned Scarlet Street entirely, relying on the statute that gave it power to censor films that were "obscene, indecent, immoral, inhuman, sacrilegious" or whose exhibition "would tend to corrupt morals or incite to crime." As if in a chain reaction, one week later the Motion Picture Commission for the city of Milwaukee also banned the film as part of a new policy encouraged by police for "stricter regulation of undesirable films." On February 3 Christina Smith, the city censor of Atlanta, argued that because of "the sordid life it portrayed, the treatment of illicit love, the failure of the characters to receive orthodox punishment from the police, and because the picture would tend to weaken a respect for the law," Scarlet Street was "licentious, profane, obscure and contrary to the good order of the community."... Universal was discouraged from challenging the constitutionality of the censors by the protests of the national religious groups that arose as the Atlanta case went to court.

In 1998, Jonathan Rosenbaum of the Chicago Reader included the film in his unranked list of the best American films not included on the AFI Top 100.

See also
 Public domain film
 List of American films of 1945
 List of films in the public domain in the United States

References

External links

 
 
 
 

 

1945 films
1945 crime drama films
American black-and-white films
American crime drama films
American films based on plays
American remakes of French films
1940s English-language films
Film noir
Films about fictional painters
Films based on adaptations
Films based on French novels
Films directed by Fritz Lang
Films produced by Walter Wanger
Films scored by Hans J. Salter
Films set in 1934
Films set in New York City
Films with screenplays by Dudley Nichols
Universal Pictures films
Articles containing video clips
Censored films
1940s American films